Lucas Höler (born 10 July 1994) is a German professional footballer who plays as a forward for Bundesliga club SC Freiburg.

Career
In May 2016, SV Sandhausen announced the signing of Höler for the 2016–17 season, on a two-year contract with the option of a third year.

In December 2017, it was announced that Höler would join SC Freiburg for the second half of the 2017–18 season. He previously had half a season left on his Sandhausen contract.

Career statistics

References

External links
 
 

1994 births
Living people
German footballers
Association football forwards
Bundesliga players
2. Bundesliga players
3. Liga players
Regionalliga players
VSK Osterholz-Scharmbeck players
VfB Oldenburg players
1. FSV Mainz 05 II players
SV Sandhausen players
SC Freiburg players
Footballers from Lower Saxony
People from Verden (district)